Diaphantania impulsalis is a moth in the family Crambidae. It was described by Gottlieb August Wilhelm Herrich-Schäffer in 1871. It is found in Cuba and Florida.

References

Moths described in 1871
Spilomelinae